Oxtoby is a surname. Notable people with the surname include:
 David Oxtoby (artist), b. 1938, British pop artist
David W. Oxtoby, the ninth and current president of Pomona College
John C. Oxtoby (1910–1991), American mathematician and professor at Bryn Mawr College
John Oxtoby (1767–1830), English evangelist and Primitive Methodist preacher
Tanya Oxtoby (born 1982), Australian football (soccer) player and coach
Willard G. Oxtoby (1933–2003), founding director of the graduate Centre for Religious Studies at the University of Toronto